No. 168 Squadron RCAF was a heavy transport (H.T.) squadron of the Royal Canadian Air Force (unrelated to No. 168 Squadron RAF) that formed at RCAF Station Rockcliffe, near Ottawa, Ontario in on 18 October, 1943. The squadron carried large quantities of mail, freight and later, passengers between Canada and the United Kingdom, as well as to locations in Europe and Africa.

Before October 1943, the Canadian Government had sent mail to Canadian service personnel in the United Kingdom by ship. However, high ship losses and the importance of mail to service personnel prompted the government to switch to air mail. The Squadron's primary role was to deliver mail to Europe, initially using six surplus Boeing Fortress heavy bomber aircraft acquired from the United States. All of the Fortresses were in poor condition when received and the RCAF made numerous modifications to the Fortresses, including  the removal of the machine guns and their turrets and the installation of a replacement solid nose that increased the quantity of mail that could be carried. The paint was later stripped off the airframes to further lighten them.

On 2 April 1944, Fortress 9207 crashed shortly after take off from Glasgow Prestwick Airport, killing all five crew members.
In August 1944, the RCAF added the first of several Consolidated Liberators to the Squadron's strength.
In addition to the Fortresses and Liberators, 168 Squadron also operated Douglas Dakotas and Lockheed Lodestar transports. A single Beechcraft Expeditor was loaned to the unit in 1944 from No. 12 (Communications) Squadron, and Lockheed Hudson Mk.III BW619 was borrowed in 1944 for mail runs in the Mediterranean. 

During its period of service the squadron completed 636 Atlantic Ocean crossings and logged 26,417 flying hours. Over  of mail,  of freight and 42,057 passengers were transported, which included additional detached operations out of Great Britain as well as Gibraltar and Morocco. One of the squadron's VIP Liberators carried  members of the British Royal Family, the Governor General of Canada and Canadian Prime Minister Mackenzie King.

Once most Canadian troops deployed to Europe had been repatriated following the end of the Second World War, the unit was disbanded on April 21, 1946.

References

Citations

Bibliography

1943 establishments in Ontario
1946 disestablishments in Ontario
Royal Canadian Air Force squadrons (disbanded)
Military units and formations disestablished in 1946
Military units and formations established in 1943
Military units and formations of Canada in World War II